West Virginia Route 85 is a north–south state highway in southern West Virginia. The southern terminus of the route is at West Virginia Route 10 in Oceana. The northern terminus is at U.S. Route 119 northwest of Danville.

Major intersections

References

085
Transportation in Boone County, West Virginia
Transportation in Wyoming County, West Virginia